Agerostrea is an extinct genus of fossil oysters, marine bivalve molluscs in the family Ostreidae, the true oysters. The genus Agerostrea is present in the Maastrichtian, the upper stage of the Late Cretaceous epoch, from 72.1 to 66 million years ago.

Species
Species within the genus Agerostrea:
†Agerostrea densicostata   Sobetski 1982 
†Agerostrea dentiformis   Kassab 1998 
†Agerostrea falcata   Morton 1827
†Agerostrea kopajevitshi  Sobetski 1982 
†Agerostrea lunata  Woods, 1912
†Agerostrea luppovi
†Agerostrea mesenterica  Morton, 1834
†Agerostrea monmouthensis
†Agerostrea nasuta
†Agerostrea negevensis Lewy 1996
†Agerostrea rouxi
†Agerostrea ungulata  (von Schlotheim 1813)

References
Paleobiology Database
Eol
Zipcodezoo
Global Names
Organismnames
Suleman A. Choudhury Longevity in Relation to Morphological Development of Agerostrea Mesenterica (Bivalvia, Ostreidae) Compared Between Two Contemporaneous Localities in the Cretaceous of New Jersey 
Melvin Sambol Evidence of Selection Pressure in Agerostrea Mesenterica (Bivalvia, Mollusca) in the Navasink Formation (upper Cretaceous) of New Jersey

External links
Mineralienatlas
Oursins
Fossilien.net

Ostreidae
Bivalve genera